= Bouquet of Love =

Studio album by Percy Faith and His Orchestra
- Released: 1962
- Genre: Easy listening
- Label: Columbia

Professional ratings
Review scores
Source	Rating
New Record Mirror	4/5 stars

Bouquet of Love is a 1962 album by Percy Faith and His Orchestra. It was released in 1962 by Columbia Records (catalog no. CS8481). It debuted on Billboard magazine's pop album chart on April 14, 1962, peaked at the No. 26 spot, and remained on the chart for five weeks.

== Track listing ==
Side A

1. "Blue Moon"
2. "Out of This World"
3. "Duet"
4. "Easy to Love"
5. "I Only Have Eyes for You"
6. "Soft Lights and Sweet Music"

Side B

1. "How High the Moon"
2. "Invitation"
3. "If I Loved You"
4. "Music Until Midnight (Lullaby for Adults Only)"
5. "Stella by Starlight"
6. "I Concentrate on You"
